Pyaas is a Bollywood film directed by  Ram Daryani and released in 1982.

Cast

Music

References

External links
 

1983 films
Films scored by Bappi Lahiri
1980s Hindi-language films